Events from the year 1960 in Canada.

Incumbents

Crown 
 Monarch – Elizabeth II

Federal government 
 Governor General – Georges Vanier
 Prime Minister – John Diefenbaker
 Chief Justice – Patrick Kerwin (Ontario)
 Parliament – 24th

Provincial governments

Lieutenant governors 
Lieutenant Governor of Alberta – John Percy Page   
Lieutenant Governor of British Columbia – Frank M. Ross (until October 12) then George Pearkes 
Lieutenant Governor of Manitoba – John S. McDiarmid (until January 15) then Errick Willis 
Lieutenant Governor of New Brunswick – Joseph Leonard O'Brien  
Lieutenant Governor of Newfoundland – Campbell Leonard Macpherson 
Lieutenant Governor of Nova Scotia – Edward Chester Plow 
Lieutenant Governor of Ontario – John Keiller MacKay 
Lieutenant Governor of Prince Edward Island – Frederick Walter Hyndman
Lieutenant Governor of Quebec – Onésime Gagnon  
Lieutenant Governor of Saskatchewan – Frank Lindsay Bastedo

Premiers 
Premier of Alberta – Ernest Manning   
Premier of British Columbia – W.A.C. Bennett 
Premier of Manitoba – Dufferin Roblin  
Premier of New Brunswick – Hugh John Flemming (until July 12) then Louis Robichaud 
Premier of Newfoundland – Joey Smallwood 
Premier of Nova Scotia – Robert Stanfield 
Premier of Ontario – Leslie Frost 
Premier of Prince Edward Island – Walter Shaw 
Premier of Quebec – Paul Sauvé (until January 2) then Antonio Barrette (January 8 to July 22) then Jean Lesage  
Premier of Saskatchewan – Tommy Douglas

Territorial governments

Commissioners 
 Commissioner of Yukon – Frederick Howard Collins 
 Commissioner of Northwest Territories – Robert Gordon Robertson

Events

January to June
 January – The Board of Broadcast Governors begins hearings in Winnipeg to determine alternatives to CBC Television. Hearings are conducted throughout the country. Eventually, numerous licences are given to: Halifax—the Finlay MacDonald group—CJCH-TV; Montreal—the Canadian Marconi Co.—CFCF-TV; Ottawa—Ernie Bushnell's group—CJOH-TV; Toronto—Baton—the Bassett group—CFTO-TV; Winnipeg—the Moffat group—CJAY-TV (CKY-TV); Edmonton—the CBC (CBXT), (which would relieve CFRN-TV of its CBC affiliation); Calgary—the Love organization—CFCN-TV; Vancouver—the Vantel group—CHAN-TV (BCTV).
 January 2 – Paul Sauvé, Premier of Quebec, dies in office.
 January 8 – Antonio Barrette becomes premier of Quebec.
 April 24 – Television station CBWFT signs on for the first time as Radio-Canada Winnipeg.
 June 8 – Saskatchewan election: Tommy Douglas's Co-operative Commonwealth Federation wins a fifth consecutive majority.
 June 22 – 1960 Quebec general election: Barrette's ruling Union nationale, is defeated by the Quebec Liberal Party, led by Jean Lesage, beginning the 'Quiet Revolution' in the historically conservative province.

July to December
 July 1 – Status Indians are given the right to vote.
 July 9 – Seven-year-old Roger Woodward became the first person accidentally to fall over the Horseshoe Falls and survive.
 July 12 – Louis Robichaud becomes premier of New Brunswick, replacing Hugh John Flemming.
 July 22 – Vincent Massey becomes the first Canadian to receive the Royal Victorian Chain.
 July 25–27 – The first First Ministers conference is held.
 August 10 – The Canadian Bill of Rights is given royal assent.
 September – York University's first class begins learning.
 September 19 – The University of Calgary is founded.
 December 17 – Quebec becomes the last province to agree to the National Health Act.
 December 20 – Ontario executes 10,000 cats due to over population.

Full date unknown
 French beginning to be recognized as language taught in schools outside of Quebec
 L'Anse aux Meadows, evidence of Viking colonization of North America is discovered in Newfoundland
 The Ford Frontenac is introduced exclusively to the Canadian market.

Arts and literature
 February 16 – The new National Gallery of Canada building opens in Ottawa.
 November 2 – The National Theatre School opens in Montreal.

New books
 Milton Acorn: Against a League of Liars
 Farley Mowat: Ordeal by Ice
 Gordon R. Dickson: Necromancer

Awards
 See 1960 Governor General's Awards for a complete list of winners and finalists for those awards.
 Stephen Leacock Award: Pierre Berton, Just Add Water and Stir

Sport
 January 16 – Gordie Howe becomes the leading scorer in National Hockey League history, passing Maurice Richard.
 April 14 – The Montreal Canadiens win their 12th (fifth consecutive) Stanley Cup by defeating the Toronto Maple Leafs 4 games to 0. The deciding game (as well being Maurice Richard's final game) was played in Maple Leaf Gardens in Toronto
May 8 – The Ontario Hockey Association's St. Catharines Teepees win their second (and final) Memorial Cup by defeating the Central Alberta Hockey League's Edmonton Oil Kings 4 games to 2. The deciding Game 6 was played at Maple Leaf Gardens in Toronto
 October 6 – Maurice Richard's number (9) is retired by the Montreal Canadiens in a ceremony at the Montreal Forum
 November 26 – The Ottawa Rough Riders win their fifth Grey Cup by defeating the Edmonton Eskimos 16 to 6 in the 48th Grey Cup played at Vancouver's Empire Stadium. Toronto's Ron Stewart became the first Canadian to win the game's official MVP award.

Births

January to June
 January 12 – Oliver Platt, actor
 January 24 –  Mark Reeds, Canadian-American ice hockey player and coach (d. 2015)
 February 11 – Grant Main, rower and Olympic gold medalist
 February 12 – George Elliott Clarke, poet and playwright
 February 14 – Walt Poddubny, ice hockey player and coach (d. 2009)
 February 14 – Meg Tilly, actress and dancer
 February 17 – Lindy Ruff, ice hockey player and coach
 February 28 – Dorothy Stratten, model, actress and murder victim (d. 1980)
 March 7 – Gail Greenough, equestrian
 March 13 - John Greyson, filmmaker
 March 15 – Carole Rouillard, long-distance runner
 March 18 - Guy Carbonneau, retired professional ice hockey player
 April 8 - Pat Duncan, politician and sixth (and first female) Premier of Yukon and the first Liberal government
 April 10 – Drew Caldwell, politician
 April 12 - Toren Smith, manga publisher and translator (d. 2013)
 April 20 - Eria Fachin, pop singer
 April 29 – Robert J. Sawyer, science fiction writer
 May 3 – Jennifer Luce, architect
 May 8 - Patrick McKenna, actor
 May 11 - Gildor Roy, actor

July to December
 July 19 – Atom Egoyan, filmmaker
 July 22 – Jane Patterson, judoka
 July 25 – Alain Robidoux, snooker player
 July 28 – Anna Marie Malone, long-distance runner
 July 31 – Dale Hunter, ice hockey player and coach
 August 17 – Chris Potter, actor
 August 27 – Mike Mahovlich, javelin thrower
 August 30 
 Mark Eyking, politician
 Guy A. Lepage, actor
 September 14 – Callum Keith Rennie, actor
 September 21 – David James Elliott, actor
 September 25 - Sonia Benezra, TV and radio interviewer and personality and actress
 October 8 - François Pérusse, comedian and humor
 November 2 – Paul Martini, pair skater
 November 6 – Kevin Neufeld, rower and Olympic gold medallist
 November 8 
 Anne Dorval, actress
 Robert Libman, politician, architect and leader of Equality Party
 November 20 - Marc Labrèche, actor, comedian and host
 December 28 – Ray Bourque, ice hockey player

Deaths

January to June
 January 2 – Paul Sauvé, lawyer, soldier, politician and 17th Premier of Quebec (b. 1907)
 February 16 – James Alexander Murray, politician and Premier of New Brunswick (b. 1864)
 February 22 – Paul-Émile Borduas, painter (b. 1905)
 June 13 – Brooke Claxton, politician and Minister (b. 1898)

July to December
 July 26 – Maud Menten, medical scientist (b. 1879)
 August 5 – Arthur Meighen, politician and 9th Prime Minister of Canada (b. 1874)
 November 5 – Mack Sennett, actor, producer, screenwriter and film director (b. 1880)
 December 12 – Louis Orville Breithaupt, 18th Lieutenant Governor of Ontario (b. 1890)
 December 19 – Jean Désy, diplomat (b. 1893)
 December 29 – Philippe Panneton, physician, academic, diplomat and writer (b. 1895)
 December 31 – C. D. Howe, politician and Minister (b. 1886)

See also
 1960 in Canadian television
 List of Canadian films

References

 
1960 in North America